This is a list of the Serbia and Montenegro national under-21 football team results from 1996 to 2006.

2000s

2003

2004

2005

2006

External links
 Football Association of Serbia
 Football Association of Montenegro

Results
Results
Serbia and Montenegro national football team results